Pervomaisc may refer to several places in Moldova:

Pervomaisc, Căuşeni, a commune in Căuşeni district
Pervomaisc, Transnistria, a commune in Transnistria
Pervomaisc, a village in Pompa Commune, Făleşti district
Pervomaisc, a village in Lenin, Transnistria
Pervomaisc, the Soviet-era name of Marienfeld village, Ialpujeni Commune, Cimişlia district

See also 
 Pervomaiscoe (disambiguation)
 Pervomaysk (disambiguation)
 Pervomaysky (disambiguation)